Lisa Hörnblad (born 6 March 1996) is a Swedish alpine skier, specialising in the speed events of Downhill and Super-G.

She represented Sweden at the 2017 World Championships in St Moritz. and at the 2018 Olympics in Pyeongchang as well.

Olympic results

References

1996 births
Swedish female alpine skiers
Alpine skiers at the 2018 Winter Olympics
Olympic alpine skiers of Sweden
Living people
21st-century Swedish women